Conus typhon, common name the typhon cone, is a species of sea snail, a marine gastropod mollusk in the family Conidae, the cone snails and their allies.

Like all species within the genus Conus, these snails are predatory and venomous. They are capable of "stinging" humans, therefore live ones should be handled carefully or not at all.

Description
The size of the shell varies between 28 mm and 91 mm.

Distribution
This marine species occurs from Northern Transkei, South Africa to the coast of East Africa.

References

  Tucker J.K. & Tenorio M.J. (2009) Systematic classification of Recent and fossil conoidean gastropods. Hackenheim: Conchbooks. 296 pp.

External links
 The Conus Biodiversity website
 Cone Shells – Knights of the Sea
 

typhon
Gastropods described in 1975